Muhammad Ahmad Ludhianvi is the current Sarparast-e-Aala of the Ahle Sunnat Wal Jama'at (ASWJ), a proscribed group in Pakistan. Ludhianvi became the head of ASWJ (then knows as Sipah-e Sahaba) upon the death of the previous chief, Ali Sher Haidri, in a 2009 ambush. Ludhianvi is also the Secretary General of Difa-e-Pakistan Council (DPC).

Ludhianvi is on the Pakistani legislature's list of persons with suspected ties to terrorism. However, he is considered as a moderate leader by the government officials compared to the other leaders of ASWJ, while he is also commonly referred as "Safer-e-Aman" (ambassador of peace) by his followers. Ludhianvi has stated that he supports sectarian harmony, as long as it does not impede his group's goal of making Pakistan a Sunni Islamic state and declaring Shia Muslims a minority, like the Ahmadiyya in Pakistan.

Family 
Ludhianvi is the son of Hafiz Sadrud Din; who migrated in 1947 from Ludhiana district of Indian Punjab to Kamalia city of Pakistani Punjab. He is descendant of a great Arain freedom fighter Maulana Abdul Qadir Ludhianvi. During the migration, his eldest brother died due to ailment; he was buried somewhere in the Indian Punjab.

Political career 
He participated in election from Constituency NA-89 Jhang (Jhang-IV), in 2008 and 2013. He got 45,216 votes in 2008 while 71,598 votes in 2013. On 9 April 2014, he was declared as winner by an election tribunal, as his winning opponent Sheikh Mohammad Akram had been disqualified, but the decision was later cancelled by the Supreme Court of Pakistan when Akram's disqualification was waived.

In 2016, Ludhianvi was restricted to participate in bypoll election from PP-78 (Jhang) but in later he was allowed to participate by the Lahore High Court. However, he decided not to contest the election and Masroor Nawaz Jhangvi (a member of his organization) was elected as the member of Punjab Assembly.

References 

Deobandis
Pakistani Islamic religious leaders
Living people
People from Jhang District
1972 births
Critics of Shia Islam
Critics of Ahmadiyya
Pakistani far-right politicians
Sipah-e-Sahaba Pakistan people
Chiefs of Sipah-e-Sahaba Pakistan
Politicians from Ludhiana